The Romen is a right tributary of the Sula with a length of 111 km and a drainage basin of 1,645 km². It begins in the northern Ukrainian Oblast of Chernihiv and flows into the Sula near the Sumy Oblast city of Romny. The average discharge quantity amounts to 3 m³/s at the delta.

The name is of Baltic origin; cf. Lithuanian romus 'quiet'.

References

Rivers of Sumy Oblast
Rivers of Chernihiv Oblast